Masood Abbas Khattak is a Pakistani politician who had been a member of the National Assembly of Pakistan from 2008 to 2013.

Political career
He was elected to the National Assembly of Pakistan from Constituency NA-6 (Nowshera-II) as a candidate of Awami National Party (ANP) in 2008 Pakistani general election. He received 36,835 votes and defeated Jamshaid ud Din. In November 2008, he was inducted into the federal cabinet of Prime Minister Yousaf Raza Gillani and was made Minister of State for Local Government and Rural Development where he served December 2012. From December 2012 to February 2011, he remained in the federal cabinet as Minister of State without any portfolio.

He ran for the seat of the National Assembly as a candidate of ANP from Constituency NA-6 (Nowshera-II) in 2013 Pakistani general election but was unsuccessful. He received 20,316 votes and lost the seat to Siraj Muhammad Khan.

References

Awami National Party politicians
People from Nowshera District
Living people
Pakistani MNAs 2008–2013
Year of birth missing (living people)